Juan Camilo Mesa Antúnez (born 23 February 1998) is a Colombian footballer who plays as a defender for Šibenik.

Career statistics

Club

Notes

References

1998 births
Living people
Colombian footballers
Colombian expatriate footballers
Association football defenders
Categoría Primera A players
Croatian Football League players
Atlético Bucaramanga footballers
América de Cali footballers
HNK Šibenik players
Colombian expatriate sportspeople in Croatia
Expatriate footballers in Croatia
People from Norte de Santander Department